Pullea perryana is a species of plant in the family Cunoniaceae. It is endemic to Fiji.

References

perryana
Endemic flora of Fiji
Near threatened plants
Near threatened biota of Oceania
Taxonomy articles created by Polbot